Agareb is a coastal town and commune in eastern Tunisia in the Sfax Governorate. It lies 20 kilometres from Sfax. As of 2004 it had a population of  9610.

It was founded by an Islamic saint of the fourteenth century, named  Brahim ben Yaakoub Sid Agareb صيد (أسد) عقارب.

Agareb has a large industrial area which includes one of largest tile plants in Tunisia. Pastoral and olive production are important.

A civil society campaign called Manish Msab ("I am not a landfill") drew national attention to Agareb as "home of the country's most toxic landfill."

References

Populated places in Sfax Governorate
Communes of Tunisia